Joseph J. Jacobs (1916–2004) was an American chemical engineer who founded Jacobs Engineering Group, a large engineering and construction company He earned degrees in chemical engineering from the New York University Tandon School of Engineering, Jacobs was a Hoover Medal recipient as well.

Early life
Jacobs was born in Brooklyn, New York, in 1916. His father was a Lebanese immigrant who sold straight razors. He attended Brooklyn Technical High School. Jacobs worked various jobs to pay for his bachelor's degree in chemical engineering from the NYU Tandon School of Engineering, and taught college while he earned his master's degree and doctorate in that field, in 1939 and 1942, respectively.

As a young engineer, he worked for Merck & Co. to develop mass production of both DDT and penicillin. In 1943, he was accidentally doused with hundreds of pounds of hot DDT when a hopper valve opened. Although coated with, by his own estimate, an inch of DDT from head to foot; Jacobs suffered no ill consequences from his exposure.

Jacobs Engineering

After World War II, he moved to California, intending to go into business himself.

In 1947, he opened a one-man consulting engineering business in Pasadena, California, where he and his wife made their home. Through both internal growth and external acquisitions, this grew into Jacobs Engineering Group, one of the largest engineering and construction companies in the world.

Later years
Jacobs stepped down as chief executive of Jacobs Engineering Group in 1992, but remained as chairman of the board. He then founded two venture capital firms and devoted time to charity work. He had previously created the Jacobs Family Foundation, which donated about $32 million to non-profit organizations. In 1998, he set up the Jacobs Center for Neighbourhood Innovation in San Diego, California.

Publications
Jacobs also authored two books. The first, The Anatomy of an Entrepreneur: Family, Culture and Ethics, was an autobiography published in 1991. The second, Compassionate Conservative: Assuming Responsibility and Respecting Human Dignity, was published in 1995 and outlined his political philosophy.

Honors
Chairman of the Board of Trustees of Polytechnic University (Polytechnic Institute of Brooklyn)
Trustee of Harvey Mudd College (Claremont, California)
In 1983, he received the Hoover Medal, which recognizes the civic and humanitarian achievements of professional engineers.
In 1994, he was elected to membership in the National Academy of Engineering. His election citation states, "For the application of chemical engineering construction principles and for service to the profession."
In 2002, he received the Carroll H. Dunn Award of Excellence from the Construction Industry Institute.
In 2003, he was inducted into the Brooklyn Tech Alumni Foundation Hall of Fame

References

External links
Jacobs Family Foundation

1916 births
2004 deaths
People from Brooklyn
American chemical engineers
People from Pasadena, California
Polytechnic Institute of New York University alumni
Members of the United States National Academy of Engineering
American people of Lebanese descent
Brooklyn Technical High School alumni
Engineers from New York City
Engineers from California
20th-century American engineers
Scientists from New York City